Mzaar Kfardebian ( — formerly Faraya Mzaar) is a ski area in Lebanon and the largest ski resort in the Middle East. It is located one hour away from Beirut, the capital of Lebanon. It is also referred to as Ouyoune el Simane.

History
In 1960, Sami Geammal, Emile Riachi and a group of pioneers installed the first ski lift imported from Switzerland, on the "refuge" hill and built the first four chalets in the region. One year later, they bought  of property from Prosper Gay-Para in order to expand the resort area.

In 1963, the Faraya Mzaar - Tourism and Winter Sports Company was launched with Sheikh Salim El-Khazen as the principal shareholder and financed by banker Joseph Abdo Khoury, who later became the company chairman and general manager. The company acquired the concession to build and operate ski lifts on lands belonging to the Kesrouan district municipalities. In 1965, the  Mzaar Hotel opened its doors, and the company installed the first chairlift on the Jabal Dib Hills. The junction between  "Refuge" and "Jabal Dib" was achieved  in 1968 through the installation of the resort's third lift which was named "Jonction".
In the 1980s,  during the civil war, the  Mzaar Company was taken over by the Saudi Group al Mabani led by Fouad Rizk and Nehme Tohme.
In 1993, after the Lebanese civil war ended, the new group started the expansion of the resort when a three-seat chairlift was installed reaching the Mzaar peak, the highest peak of the area, and more chairlifts were to follow.

Name controversy
"Mzaar" is the Arabic word for shrine or sanctuary. The highest peak in  Ouyoune el Simane was called "Jabal el Mzaar" (mountain of the shrine) after a small Roman temple built on its top. It is believed  that the Romans were using fire as signals to communicate between the coastal area and Baalbeck, or Heliopolis, through Faqra and the Mzaar peak. The temple was totally destroyed during the civil war (1975-1990) and its stones were stolen.

The official name of the area is Ouyoune el Simane, which means "Spring of the Common Quail", and it is administratively under the jurisdiction of the municipality of Kfardebian, which is also the case for the Faqra ski resort. The Mzaar ski resort is commonly but inaccurately referred to as "Faraya-Mzaar" or simply Faraya in reference to the larger town located at lower elevations.

Skiing area
Ski season usually stretches from early December to early April.

On the top of Mzaar slope, upon exiting the chairlift, there is a view over the Bekaa Valley, Mount Hermon of the Anti-Lebanon and other peaks like Zaarour, Laqlouq and the Cedars. Coastal towns and the capital Beirut can be seen on clear days.

The highest peak is Mzaar, followed by Wardeh and Jabal Dib (mountain of the wolf) Peak, offer challenges for the experienced skier or snowboarder. Three other peaks are well suited for beginners, and even more are adapted to skier of intermediate level. In addition, there are a number of cross-country trails.
Usually, opening hours during the week is from 8am to 3:30pm but it extends until 4pm during the weekend.

A large variety of other activities and excursions are also available.

Along with traditional alpine skiing, people can practice ski-doo, night skiing, snow boarding. Entertainment such as ski shows and fashion shows, including G-string models, are organized to promote the resort.

Natural and historical sites

Ski clubs
Mzaar-Kfardebian is home to several different Lebanese ski clubs which are affiliated to the Lebanese Ski Federation founded in 1961.

See also
List of ski areas and resorts in Asia
Asian Alpine Ski Championships-2000,2008,2009,2016,2017,2022.
Skiing

References 
Mema, J. P. (Photographer). (2008). Faraya from the sky. [Web Photo]. Retrieved from Snow Forecast, Snow Reports & Snow Conditions

External links
Mzaar ski resort, official website
Mzaar ski resort and hotels in Faraya and Mzaar Lebanon

Geography of Lebanon
Ski areas and resorts in Lebanon
Sport in Lebanon